A time-use survey is a statistical survey which aims to report data on how, on average, people spend their time.

Objectives 

The objective of the Time-Use survey is to identify, classify and quantify the main types of activity that people engage in during a definitive time period, e.g. a year, a month, etc. Many surveys are used for calculation of unpaid work done by women as well as men in particular locality.

See also 
American Time Use Survey 
Productive and unproductive labour
Value added
Metropolitan Travel Survey Archive

References 
Origin of Time Use surveys
British ESRC Time Use programme
Japanese info #2
Info from Germany and some other countries
United States info #2
British info #2
Info from Statistics New Zealand
Canadian info #2
 United Nations, Guide to Producing Statistics on Time-use Measuring Paid and Unpaid Work. New York: United Nations, 2005.

Survey methodology